
The Arch Street Friends Meeting House, at 320 Arch Street at the corner of 4th Street in the Old City neighborhood of Philadelphia, Pennsylvania, is a Meeting House of the Religious Society of Friends (Quakers). Built to reflect Friends’ testimonies of simplicity and equality, this building is little changed after more than two centuries of continuous use.

Pennsylvania founder and Quaker William Penn deeded land to the Society of Friends in 1701 to be used as a burial ground. The east wing and center of the meetinghouse was built between 1803 and 1805 according to a design by the Quaker carpenter Owen Biddle Jr.  Biddle is best known as the author of a builder's handbook, The Young Carpenter's Assistant, published in 1805. The building was enlarged in 1810–11, with the addition of the west wing.  Architects Walter Ferris Price and Morris & Erskine also contributed to the design and construction of the building.  The firm Cope & Lippincott renovated the interior of the east wing and designed the two-story addition behind the center building in 1968–69.

Today, the Meeting House continues to be a center for worship and the activities of the Monthly Meeting of Friends of Philadelphia and Philadelphia Yearly Meeting.

Notable members of the Religious Society of Friends who worshiped at this meetinghouse include abolitionists and woman rights advocates Sarah and Angelina Grimke. Edward Hicks, the noted painter and cousin of Elias Hicks, also attended meeting here.

The meetinghouse was listed on the National Register of Historic Places in 1971 and declared a National Historic Landmark in 2011.  The latter designation was as a consequence of the building being the only surviving documented work by Owen Biddle.

Notable interments
The ground upon which the meetinghouse was built was the first burial ground for Quakers in Philadelphia.  Although the plot was officially given to the Society of Friends by William Penn in 1701, burials had been taking place here since as early as 1683.  According to reports, Quakers were buried here alongside of “Indians, Blacks and strangers.”

Notable interments include:

Charles Brockden Brown (1771–1810), the first American novelist (Wieland)
Samuel Carpenter (1649–1714) and most of his family and his brother Abraham Carpenter (a non-member who married a Quaker) were buried in the Friends Burial Ground. Samuel was a Deputy Governor under William Penn and the "First Treasurer" of Pennsylvania.
Lydia Darrah (1728–1789), Revolutionary War spy
John Eckley (1652–1690), First Purchaser, merchant and judge of the Provincial Court in Philadelphia.
James Logan (1674–1751), secretary to William Penn
Samuel Nicholas (1744–1790), founder and first commandant of the United States Marine Corps. Each November 10, Marines mark his grave with a wreath at dawn.
Robert Waln (1765–1836), U.S. Congressman
Dr. Thomas Wynne (1627–1691), personal physician of William Penn and one of the original settlers of Philadelphia in the Province of Pennsylvania. Born in Wales, he accompanied Penn on his original journey to America on the ship Welcome.
 Caspar Wistar (1761–1818), American physician, professor of anatomy and vice president of the American Philosophical Society.  Wistar mentored Meriwether Lewis before Lewis joined William Clark on the expedition to cross the western part of the continent.

Gallery

See also

List of National Historic Landmarks in Philadelphia
National Register of Historic Places listings in Center City, Philadelphia
Race Street Friends Meetinghouse

References
Notes

Further reading
Barnes, Gregory. Philadelphia’s Arch Street Meeting House: A Biography, Philadelphia, PA: QuakerPress, 2013.
Bronner, Edwin B. "Quaker Landmarks in Early Philadelphia", Transactions of the American Philosophical Society, New Ser., Vol. 43, No. 1 (1953), pp. 210–216.

External links

Listing and photographs at the Historic American Buildings Survey
Listing at Philadelphia Architects and Buildings
Friends Arch Street Meeting House Burial Ground at Find A Grave
Listing at visitphilly.com
Listing in the Colored Conventions project

Churches in Philadelphia
Properties of religious function on the National Register of Historic Places in Philadelphia
Quaker meeting houses in Pennsylvania
Churches completed in 1804
Old City, Philadelphia
Colored Conventions
Churches on the National Register of Historic Places in Pennsylvania
National Historic Landmarks in Pennsylvania